Kirk Mathews (born c. 1957) is an American politician. He is a Republican former member of the Missouri House of Representatives, having served from 2015 to 2019.

References

1950s births
21st-century American politicians
Living people
Republican Party members of the Missouri House of Representatives